Caroline Sanderson is a British non-fiction author and books journalist.

Since 2000 she has written non-fiction previews for The Bookseller, where she is associate editor. She has published books about Adele, Jane Austen and children's games, and a children's book about Greece. She hosts the Authors' Matters podcast for the Authors' Licensing and Collecting Society.

In 2015-2017 she held a Royal Literary Fund fellowship at the University of Worcester. In 2022 she was chair of the judges for the Baillie Gifford Prize.

Sanderson has a BA in French language and literature from the Durham University, St John's College.

Selected publications

References

External links
LinkedIn page

Year of birth missing (living people)
Living people
21st-century British women writers
Alumni of St John's College, Durham